The Poison Red is the ninth studio album by American rock band Nonpoint. It was produced by Rob Ruccia and released on July 8, 2016, via Spinefarm Records. The band released two singles from the album: "Generation Idiot" and "Divided.. Conquer Them". It is the first album to feature lead guitarist B.C. Kochmit.

Track listing
All songs and lyrics written by Nonpoint.

Critical reception

The Poison Red has received generally positive reviews from music critics. Megan Lockard (Cryptic Rock) praised the album and stated that "Nonpoint has used The Poison Red to highlight the story of life, beautifully. With lyrics that illustrate the different trials people face every day and hard-hitting beats to fill in the rest of the story, The Poison Red is an album full of deep, rich emotion." Nicholas Senior of New Noise Magazine wrote, "The Poison Red is a really fun album that harnesses the right amount of anger, mixing it in with shout-a-long choruses and meaty riffs."

Riley Rowe (Metal Injection) was more critical, stated that "Nonpoint has sharpened their songwriting, melody, and edge, but lack the capability to fully capture my attention. While I enjoyed the singles and a few tracks here and there, the overall impact of the album was a tad predictable." UG Team (Ultimate Guitar) said, "All in all, though, this record, cliches and all, isn't all that bad. You're probably not going to lose yourself in it unless you're already a huge Nonpoint fan, but the songs are good for a listen and there's a lot of good riffs and solos to like on the album."

Personnel
Nonpoint
Elias Soriano – lead vocals
Robb Rivera – drums
Rasheed Thomas – rhythm guitar, backing vocals
Adam Woloszyn – bass
B.C. Kochmit – lead guitar, backing vocals

Production
Nonpoint – producer
Rob Ruccia – co-producer, engineering, mixing
Cliff Weiner – management
Steve Davis – management
Brad Blackwood – mastering
B.C. Kochmit – artwork, layout, design

Charts

References

2016 albums
Nonpoint albums